Taraji Wadi Al-Nes Sports Club or simply Taraji Wadi Al-Nes is a Palestinian football team, based in the town of Wadi Al-Nes outside of Bethlehem, that plays in the West Bank Premier League.

Achievements
 West Bank League
 Champions (2): 2008–09, 2013–14

 West Bank First League
 Champions (1): 1998-99

 West Bank Cup
 Champions (1): 2007-08, 2009–10

 West Bank Football League Cup
 Champions (2): 2010, 2010–11
 Runners-up (2): 2007, 2013–14

 West Bank Super Cup
 Champions (1): 2010

Current squad

Twinning
 Espérance Sportive de Tunis (Tunisian Club)

References

External links
League at fifa.com

Football clubs in the West Bank
Association football clubs established in 1984
1984 establishments in the Palestinian territories